Max TV was a New Zealand music channel available free to air on UHF channel 49 in Auckland from 28 October 1993 to 3 December 1997.

When Max TV began transmission it was known as Max: The Music Channel. The channel was jointly owned and operated by Aztel Holdings (radio personality Kevin Black, who owned the frequency licence, and his partner Jeff Thorpe) and On-Line Productions, a video production house.

The channel initially broadcast from 4:00pm until midnight Monday to Thursday; 4:00pm until 1:00am on Friday; 7:00am until 1:00am on Saturday; and 7:00am until midnight on Sunday. By April 1996 its transmission hours were extended to 24 hours a day, seven days a week.

On 20 May 1997, the channel broadcast the music video to Iggy Pop's song "Pussy Walk". Local feminist group Women Against Pornography considered the music video 'offensive and insulting to women'.

On 2 December 1997, Television New Zealand announced that the channel would close down on the following day.

References

Television channels and stations established in 1993
Television channels and stations disestablished in 1997
Defunct television channels in New Zealand
1993 establishments in New Zealand
1997 disestablishments in New Zealand